Jean-Baptiste Boucho (February 18, 1797-March 6, 1871) was the Vicar Apostolic of Malacca-Singapore.

Biography
Jean-Baptiste Boucho was born in Athos-Aspis, France and in 1824, moved to Malaya where he was ordained as a priest of the La Société des Missions Etrangères dedicated to missionary work. In Penang, he was appointed the Parish Priest of the Church of the Assumption and established the Catholic Free School for boys. 

On June 10, 1845, Pope Gregory XVI appointed him Vicar Apostolic of Malacca-Singapore and Titular Bishop of Attalea in Pamphylia. On October 19, 1845, he was consecrated bishop by Archbishop Patrick Joseph Carew, Vicar Apostolic of Bengal. Bishop Marc-Thomas Oliffe, Coadjutor Vicar Apostolic of Bengal, served as Co-Consecrator.

See also 
Catholic Church in Malaysia

References

1797 births
1871 deaths
Bishops appointed by Pope Gregory XVI
Paris Foreign Missions Society bishops
Roman Catholic bishops of Malacca-Singapore